Upton Scott Heath (October 10, 1784 – February 21, 1852) was a United States district judge of the United States District Court for the District of Maryland.

Education and career

Born on October 10, 1784, in Maryland, Heath was in private practice in Maryland until 1835. He was a city councilman for Baltimore, Maryland from 1825 to 1826.

Federal judicial service

Heath was nominated by President Andrew Jackson on April 1, 1836, to a seat on the United States District Court for the District of Maryland vacated by Judge Elias Glenn. He was confirmed by the United States Senate on April 4, 1836, and received his commission the same day. His service terminated on February 21, 1852, due to his death in Baltimore.

References

Sources
 
 Helen W. Ridgeley, "The Ancient Churchyards of Baltimore", in The Grafton Magazine of History and Genealogy (1910), Volume 2, p. 111.

1784 births
1852 deaths
Judges of the United States District Court for the District of Maryland
United States federal judges appointed by Andrew Jackson
19th-century American judges